Saviane is an Italian surname. Notable people with the surname include:

Giorgio Saviane (1916–2000), Italian author
Paolo Saviane (1962–2021), Italian politician

See also
Saviano (surname)

Italian-language surnames